Putnam City North High School (PCN, PC North) is a public high school situated in Northwest Oklahoma City, Oklahoma, United States It is accredited by the North Central Association of Secondary Schools and is one of three high schools in the Putnam City School District. Offering education in grades nine through twelve, North is among the highest scoring public schools in Oklahoma, ranging from End of Instruction tests to college admission exams.

History
Putnam City North High School opened its doors August 24, 1978. In its first year, the school took 750 sophomores and juniors from Putnam City High School and Hefner Middle School.

In 1993, the school added a freshman class and became a four-year high school.

Notable alumni
Sam Bradford, 2008 Heisman Trophy winner, University of Oklahoma quarterback 2007–2009. Number 1 overall pick of the 2010 NFL Draft.
Glenn Coffee, first Republican President Pro Tempore of the Oklahoma Senate
David Holt, Mayor of Oklahoma City, former Oklahoma State Senator, former Chief of Staff to the Mayor of Oklahoma City, former White House staffer, former aide to U.S. Speaker of the House
Shibani Joshi, on-air reporter for FOX Business Network
Deji Karim, running back with the Jacksonville Jaguars, 2009 Finalist for Football Championship Subdivision Walter Payton Award
Joseph Loy, intellectual property trial attorney at Kirkland & Ellis LLP.
Jamie Marchi, voice actor
James Marsden, film actor, becoming well known in the X-Men series, and Westworld.
Mike Mitchell, film director (Deuce Bigalow: Male Gigolo, Sky High, Surviving Christmas, Shrek Forever After)
Olivia Munn, film actor (Date Night, Iron Man 2), correspondent on Comedy Central'''s The Daily Show, co-host of "Attack of the Show!" on the G4 Network, model featured in Maxim (magazine) and PlayboyLance Parker, professional soccer player formerly with Chivas USA in MLS and currently with FC Edmonton
Kristy Wood Starling, Christian recording artist. Finished second place in NBC's Today Show''s "Today's Superstar" contest in 2002
Elizabeth Garrett, former president of Cornell University

References

External links
Putnam City North's Website
Putnam City School District Website

Educational institutions established in 1978
Public high schools in Oklahoma
Schools in Oklahoma City
1978 establishments in Oklahoma